Ornipholidotos tirza is a butterfly in the family Lycaenidae. It is found in Cameroon, the Republic of the Congo and Gabon. The habitat consists of forests.

References

Butterflies described in 1873
Ornipholidotos
Butterflies of Africa
Taxa named by William Chapman Hewitson